This is the discography of British singer-songwriter Beverley Craven.

Albums

Studio albums

Live albums

Compilation albums

Video albums

Singles

Collaborations
1990: Backing vocals on the song "Where Angels Fear", on Breathe's album Peace of Mind.
1992: Contributed the lullaby "Hush Little Baby" to the charity album Tommy's Tape.
1999: Lead vocals on the song "The Very Last Time", from Alan Parsons' album The Time Machine.
2005: Backing vocals on Rob Cowen's single "Lady Advertiser".
2013: Lead vocals on the song "You're Mine", from Nigel Hitchcock's album Smoothitch.

References

Discographies of British artists
Pop music discographies